Aphelandra is a genus of about 170 species of flowering plants in the family Acanthaceae, native to tropical regions of the Americas.

The flowers are produced in dense spikes, with brightly coloured bracts.

Several species are grown as houseplants for their patterned leaves and brightly coloured inflorescences.

Pharmacological activity
Pharmacological reports on genus Aphelandra are Antibacterial activity, Antifungal activity and Immunomodulatory activity.

Phytochemistry
Phytochemical reports on genus Aphelandra are Alkaloids, Flavonoids, Isoflavones, Benzoxazinoids-cyclic hydroxamic acid and their corresponding glucosides.

Selected species
Aphelandra albinotata
Aphelandra anderssonii
Aphelandra attenuata
Aphelandra aurantiaca (Scheidw.) Lindl.
Synonyms - Aphelandra fascinator, Aphelandra nitens
Aphelandra azuayensis
Aphelandra bahiensis (Nees) Wassh.
Aphelandra chamissoniana Nees
Aphelandra chrysantha
Aphelandra cinnabarina
Aphelandra claussenii Wassh.
Aphelandra colorata (Vell. Conc.) Wassh.
Aphelandra deppeana
Aphelandra dodsonii
Aphelandra galba
Aphelandra guayasii
Aphelandra gunnari
Aphelandra harleyi Wassh.
Aphelandra harlingii

Aphelandra ignea (Schrader) Nees ex Steudel
Aphelandra lineariloba Leonard
Aphelandra madrensis Lindau
Aphelandra marginata Nees & Martius
Aphelandra maximiliana (Nees) Benth
Aphelandra mirabilis Rizzini
Aphelandra neesiana Wassh.
Aphelandra nemoralis Nees
Aphelandra loxensis
Aphelandra nuda Nees
Aphelandra obtusa (Nees) Wassh.
Aphelandra obtusifolia (Nees) Wassh.
Aphelandra paulensis Wassh.
Aphelandra phaina
Aphelandra phrynioides Lindau
Aphelandra rigida
Aphelandra ruellia
Aphelandra sinclairiana Nees - Coral aphelandra
Aphelandra squarrosa - Zebra plant
Aphelandra stephanophysa
Aphelandra sulphurea
Aphelandra tetragona (Vahl) Nees
Aphelandra tridentata
Aphelandra zamorensis

References

 
Acanthaceae genera
Flora of Pakistan